The 1972–73 Iraq Central FA First Division was the 25th and last season of the Iraq Central FA League (the top division of football in Baghdad and its neighbouring cities from 1948 to 1973); it began on 16 October 1972. The first half of the season concluded on 31 December 1972 at which point the season was ended; this was due to scheduling difficulties with the Iraq national and military teams' matches that caused the cancellation of the second half of the season. Al-Quwa Al-Jawiya, who led the table at the halfway point having won all of their seven games, were thus crowned champions for their fourth league title.

After the premature end to the season, the Iraq Central Football Association organised the Independent Baghdad Tournament between the same eight teams to allow them to continue playing matches in the absence of their national team and military team players.

The Central FA League along with the Basra League, Kirkuk League and Mosul League were replaced by a nationwide league, the Iraqi National First Division, from the following season.

Name changes 
 Al-Firqa Al-Thalitha renamed to Quwat Salahaddin.

League table

Results

Top goalscorers

References

External links 
 Iraqi Football Website

Iraq Central FA League seasons
Iraq
League